Raymond Charles Stedman (October 5, 1917 – October 7, 1992) was an evangelical Christian pastor, and author. He was a long-time pastor of Peninsula Bible Church in Palo Alto, California, and author of several books.

Early life
Stedman worked in Montana which included being a Brahma bull rider in rodeos.

In 1946, Stedman began attending Dallas Theological Seminary, befriending Howard Hendricks, and graduating in 1950.

Before his move to the Peninsula Bible Fellowship in Palo Alto, California to provide pastoral care in 1950, Stedman worked alongside J. Vernon McGee, a preacher widely known in Evangelical circles for his radio ministry.

Career
Peninsula Bible Fellowship became Peninsula Bible Church, with Stedman pastoring there for 40 years.

Some books by Stedman
Adventuring Through the Bible: A Comprehensive Guide to the Entire Bible  by Ray C. Stedman and James D. Denney (Hard cover 1997 Elaine Stedman) (Paperback - Sep 1, 2005)
Authentic Christianity: The Classic Bestseller on Living the Life of Faith With Integrity  by Ray C. Stedman (Paperback - Oct 1996)
Spiritual Warfare: Winning the Daily Battle With Satan  by Ray C. Stedman (Paperback - Jun 1999)
Joy of Living Bible Studies on each of the following: Nehemiah, Job, Psalms of Faith, Prophecy in the Book of Daniel, Mark Part 1 & Part 2, Acts, Romans, Ephesians and Revelation commentary by Ray Stedman with study questions by Nancy J Collins and/or Kathy G Rowland (Spiral Bound - 2001 through 2012) Body Life: The Book That Inspired a Return to the Church's Real Meaning and Mission – August 1, 1995 by Ray C. Stedman 
The Way to Wholeness: Lessons from Leviticus by Ray C. Stedman (Paperback Jun 2005 Elaine Stedman)
Waiting for the Second Coming by Ray C. Stedman

Notes

External links
www.RayStedman.org authentic Christianity - Official Web Site of Ray Stedman Ministries (US, Worldwide)
Daily Devotional: The Power of His Presence—Daily Devotional from Ray Stedman & Mark S. Mitchell
Daily Devotional: Immeasurably More—Daily Devotional from Ray Stedman & Mark S. Mitchell
Portrait of Integrity: The Life of Ray C. Stedman (Paperback) by Mark S. Mitchell (Author)
Peninsula Bible Church website - 800 Sermons
Joy of Living Bible Studies - Studies by Ray Stedman

1917 births
1992 deaths
20th-century American male writers
20th-century American non-fiction writers
20th-century Christian clergy
20th-century evangelicals
American Christian clergy
American evangelicals
American male non-fiction writers
American sermon writers
Dallas Theological Seminary alumni
Evangelical writers
People from Emmons County, North Dakota